Brahmapur (also known as Berhampur) is a city on the eastern coastline of India. It is famous for beaches and many adventure places. It is a leading devloped city in Odisha. It is well known for the business and trading hub of the state as well as of eastern India. Overall it is also known for its perfect city dimensions due to its area, population, business, institutions, tourists places, communication, etc. Bramhapur is most famous for its street food, silk sarees or pato sarees, temples and many historical places. Bramhapur also dubbed as Food Capital of Odisha, and Silk City of India.

Etymology 
The name of the city is said to have been derived from the name of Lord Brahmeswara, worshipped in a temple at Lathi, 4 km from the main town.

History
Jaugada, present 35 km away from Brahmapur on the banks of the Rushikulya, was an ancient fort and city existing from 3rd century BC to 7th century AD. Its existence before and after this time period cannot be ruled out. Also called Samapa, it was a provincial headquarter of Maurya Dynasty along with Dhauli as evident from the edicts found at both places. Specific history about the place and civilisation doesn't exist after the Maurya Dynasty and the fort is now buried.

The cult of Buddhi Thakurani originated along with the emergence of Brahmapur town in and around 1672 AD. Telugu Lengayat Dera (weaver) community, who came to Mahuri on the invitation of Raja Saheb of Mahuri to take up their profession of weaving, started Ghata Yatra (Pot Festival) for highlighting the divinity of Mahamayee Thakurani of his capital town Brahmapur. The Chief of the Dera community, Kota Chandramani Kubera Senapati, led his community people to migrate to Mahuri and Brahmapur who settle down into their hereditary profession of weaving tussar silken products or Patta Matha. The Ghata Yatra was initiated for the purpose of highlighting the tradition of worshiping Thakurani as well as to use it as a platform for sales promotion of their silken products.

In April 1923, a meeting of the 'Utkal Union Conference' was held at Brahmapur under the  chairmanship of Kalpataru Das. Many Congress workers took part in it. They supported the main idea of amalgamation of the Odia areas under one administration, but differed on the course of action to be taken to fulfil the objective.

It's finally became a part of Orissa Province on 1 April 1936 by amalgamation of Odia-speaking lands carved out from Madras Presidency along with Ganjam district and other Southern Odisha regions.

Geography
The city is at 19° 20' N Latitude 84° 50' E Longitude. Its average elevation above mean sea level is 24 m.
The town stands on a rocky  ledge 78 feet above the mean sea level, surrounded by an extensive cultivated plain. In a direct line, the distance of the place from the sea is 11 km. On the east and south this plain is open and it slopes towards the sea but on the north and west, it is bounded by the Mohiri or Kerandi hills, some 2500 feet high and about 14 km from Brahmapur.

Brahmapur lies 25 km away from Rushikulya river and in its basin. Several small streams including Sapua nadi and Hati nadi flow through it.

A perfect amalgamation of Odia and Telugu communities can be seen here due to its being very near to the Odisha–Andhra border which turned itself into a major financial hub in Southern Odisha.

Boundaries of the city

North: Chandaniapahad, Ambagada, Ratnapur, Jagadalpur, Nimakhandi, Luchapda, Bhabinipur, Bada Gumula, Pali Gumula, Sana Kausasthali and Narendrapur.

South: Arua Palli, Brahmapalli, Khajuria, Phulta, Haladiapadar.

East: Raghunathpur, Pathara, Dura, Mandiapalli, Aruvapalli.

West: Bendalia, Lathi, Sukunda, Chandania Pahada, Ambagada.

Administration
The city is administered by the Brahmapur Municipal Corporation (BeMC). The city used to be a first municipality which was formed in 1867, and was upgraded to a municipal corporation on 29 December 2008. The Municipal body completed its 150 years in 2017.

The Revenue Divisional Commissioner (RDC) of Southern range is located in Brahmapur and covers the undivided Ganjam, Koraput, Kandhamal and Kalahandi districts.

The headquarters for Brahmapur Tehsil, District Education Office (Ganjam) and Brahmapur Sub-Division are also situated here.

Demographics

 Census of India (provisional), the population of Berhampur was 355,823, of which 185,584 were males and 170,239 were females making it the fourth most populous urban city in Odisha state and 126th in India.

The effective literacy rate of Berhampur was 90.04%, higher than the national average of 74.04%. Male and female literacy rates were 93.83% and 85.92%, respectively. 8.2% of the population were children ages 0–6 years. The adult and child sex ratios were 917 and 898 females per 1000 males, respectively.

Transportation

Road
Brahmapur city is connected with National Highways NH-16 (Chennai–Kolkata), NH-59 (Brahmapur-Khariar), NH-516 (Narendrapur-Gopalpur), State Highway 17 (Odisha) and State Highway 22 (Odisha) which connect almost all other cities and towns of Odisha.

Three-wheeler auto taxis are the most important mode of transportation in this city, with Taxis also on the city's roads. Online "C-cabs" and "ola" taxi-service app is also available. The state government has constructed a new bus station at Haladiapadar, at the outskirts of the city. The Ganjam Urban Transport Services Limited (GUTSL) with joint partnership with Odisha State Road Transport Corporation (OSRTC) have an agreement to run a city-bus service for Brahmapur to urban centres on its periphery (Chatrapur, Gopalpur and Hinjili, Taratarini, Bhairabi) since 27 February 2014.

Train
Brahmapur Railway Station is a major railway station of Odisha and India. It was first opened in 1896. It is connected with two major stations (Howrah-Chennai) through Howrah- Chennai main route. The railway station is located at the heart of the city. It has a typical British architecture style and has 4 platforms.

It handles mostly passenger traffic while cargo is handled at the nearby Jagannathpur Station.

Air
The city has an airport at Rangeilunda. The airstrip was in use during British Raj and World War II. However, post independence, it has lied in a dilapidated condition with no scope of expansion due to its adjacence to Berhampur University. Demands for a new greenfield airport have been echoing throughout the years but have remained futile due to government inaction.

In 2018, the airport was selected for developing it into a commercial airport by the government's UDAN scheme. In view of this, in March 2023, it started commercial operations to Bhubaneswar, with flights operated twice a week.

Sea 
The Gopalpur port was recommisioned after renovation and expansion. It is a private port and handles mineral exports and imports. No passenger ships, cruises or ferries operate to or from there as of 2021.

Climate and regional setting
Maximum summer temperature is 40 °C; minimum winter temperature is 22 °C. The mean daily temperature varies from 33 °C to 38 °C. May is the hottest month; December is the coldest. The average annual rainfall is 1250 mm and the region receives monsoon and torrential rainfall from July to October.

Educational institutions
 Berhampur University

 Binayak Acharya College
 Ganjam Law College
 Indian Institute of Science Education and Research Berhampur (IISER, Berhampur)
 Kalam Institute of Technology (KIT)
 Khallikote Unitary University
 Lingaraj Law College
 Maharaja Krushna Chandra Gajapati Medical College and Hospital 
 Parala Maharaja Engineering College (PMEC)
 Roland Institute of Technology
 Uma Charan Pattnaik Engineering School
 Vignan Institute of Technology and Management

 

 Asian Institute of Social Science & Technology (AISST)
 Berhampur City College
 Berhampur School of Engineering & Technology
 Bharat Institute of Engineering & Technology Polytechnic College
 Biju Patnaik Homeopathic Medical College & Hospital
 Biswakarma ITI
 Brundaban Nayak Memorial Industrial Training Centre
 College of Fisheries, Rangeilunda (OUAT)
 College of Pharmaceutical Sciences, Mohuda
 Disha College of Management and Technology
 Gandhi Academy of Technology and Engineering (GATE)
 Gandhi School of Engineering (GSE)
 Gayatri Institute of Science & Technology
 Government ITI, Brahmapur
 Imperial College of Hotel Management & Tourism
 Kaviraj Ananta Tripathy Sharma Ayurvedic Medical College and Hospital
 Mahamayee Mahila Mahavidyalaya
 National Institute of Science & Technology (NIST)
 New Hope Society School of Nursing
 Om Sai College of Pharmacy & Health Science
 PG Centre For Management Studies
 Rahul Institute of Technology
 Roland Institute of Computer and Management
 Roland Institute of Pharmaceutical Science
 Royal College of Pharmacy and Health Sciences
 Sanjaya Memorial Institute of Technology
 Sashi Bhusan Rath Government Women's College
 School of Nursing & Health Sciences, Bijipur
 Shalom Institute of Management Studies
 Sivananda College of Pharmacy
 Xavier College of Hotel Management

Culture and Contemporary life
Brahmapur is famous for its food and markets and also known as food capital of Odisha.

Most famous markets are Annapurna Market, Bada Bazaar, Sano Bazaar, Bhapur Bazaar, Giri Market, Hanuman Market, Ganesh Market and Sai Complex. The mango market of Brahmapur is one of the largest wholesale mango markets in India. The Balunkeswara Bana Market here is one of the largest in the state.

Arts 
Brahmapur has been an important site of the state's culture due to its unique Odia culture and has held several national level Odia and Telugu literary meets.

Sri Sitaram Vilas Talkies (SSVT) was the first cinema theatre in Odisha.

Currently, 5 Cinema theatres are running in the city, screening movies in English, Hindi, Telugu, and Odia.

There has been a critical lack of museums. The open air Scrap Museum near ITI is one of the largest in India.

Festivals 
The Thakurani Jatra(biennial) is the most important festival in the city and is one of the state festivals of Odisha. The cult of Buddhi Thakurani originated along with the emergence of Brahmapur town in and around 1672 AD. The Ghata Yatra was initiated for the purpose of  highlighting the tradition of worshiping Thakurani as well as to use it as a platform for sales promotion of silken products. 

The date for Thakurani Yatra was fixed by the yatra management committee at the house of Desi Behera, Chief of the Dera community. Buddhi Thakurani is considered as the daughter of the Desi Behera and the deity stays with her father's family during the entire Yatra period.

Sports 
Brahmapur Stadium is the largest stadium and has hosted several Ranji Trophy matches. It has a sports hostel where talented sportspersons stay and practice.

Khallikote College Stadium is another large stadium.

Notable people

 Binayak Acharya, former Chief Minister of Odisha
 V. V. Giri, former President of India
 Madhu Sudhan Kanungo, Indian Scientist, Academician, Neurologist, Doctor & Teacher.
 Lingaraj Panigrahi, Former Chief Justice of Orissa High Court and politician
 Kota Harinarayana, scientist, former Programme Director and Chief Designer of India's Light Combat Aircraft Tejas programme
 Celina Jaitly, actress and model, studied at Khallikote College 
 K Ravi Kumar, won gold in weightlifting at 2010 Commonwealth Games and also participated in 2012 London Olympics.
 Siddhanta Mahapatra, actor and politician
 Lisa Mishra, singer
 Sisir Mishra,  Hindi/Odia film director 
 Sanjukta Panigrahi, Odissi dancer
Sulagna Panigrahi, actress
 Arun K. Pati, quantum physicist
 A. P. Patro, Minister of Public Works and Education (Madras Presidency) (1921–1926)
 W. V. V. B. Ramalingam, mathematics teacher and freedom fighter
 Waheeda Rehman, actress and dancer started her career at Ganjam Kala Parishad, Berhampur.

Politics
Brahmapur city is part of Berhampur Assembly Constituency and Gopalpur Assembly Constituency.

Brahmapur is under the jurisdiction of Berhampur (Lok Sabha constituency).

References

 
Cities and towns in Ganjam district
Port cities in India